The Party of the Bulgarian Communists (PBK) is a communist party in Bulgaria, registered in 2006.

The PBK was founded in February 1999 as the Bulgarian Communist Party "Georgi Dimitrov" (BKP-GD) by the Initiative Committee for the Unification of the Communist Movement of Bulgaria. In January 2000 it was joined by the United Communist Party of Bulgaria (BEKP). In 2005 the Marxist Platform of BSP joined the BKP-GD which received its present name on 15 July 2006.

The party participated in the parliamentary elections of 1999 with the Alliance Coalition of Left Bulgaria which won 8,762 votes (0.2%) and no seats. In the local elections of 1999 the PBK won 36 seats and 18 mayoral posts. In 2003 it kept nine seats and five mayoral posts. In 2014 it took part in the parliamentary elections on the List of the BSP – Left Bulgaria winning no seat.

The PBK publishes the newspaper Novo Rabotnichesko Delo.

References

1999 establishments in Bulgaria
Communist parties in Bulgaria
Eurosceptic parties in Bulgaria
Political parties established in 1999

International Meeting of Communist and Workers Parties